Keli Nicole Price is an American singer-songwriter and background vocalist, best known for her work with producer Rodney "Darkchild" Jerkins and The Goldmind Inc.. She has written for Beyoncé ("Deja Vu") and Angie Stone, among others.

Songwriting and vocal credits

Credits are courtesy of Discogs, Spotify and AllMusic.

Background Vocals

Filmography

Awards and nominations

References 

Living people
American rhythm and blues singer-songwriters
People from Chesapeake, Virginia
Singer-songwriters from Virginia
American women singer-songwriters
21st-century American singers
21st-century American women singers
Year of birth missing (living people)